Wolf Ackva (30 July 1911 – 16 January 2000) was a German actor. He appeared in more than 70 films and television shows between 1935 and 1996.

Selected filmography

References

External links

1911 births
2000 deaths
People from Montigny-lès-Metz
People from Alsace-Lorraine
German male film actors
20th-century German male actors